Suomen kansallisbiografia is a collection of more than 6,000 biographies of individuals and families who have made important contributions to the development of Finnish society.

References

External links 
 Suomen kansallisbiografia 
 The National Biography of Finland – English online selection of 100 biographies of famous national figures

Society of Finland
Online person databases
Encyclopedias of history
Finnish encyclopedias